Ondřej Moravec (born 9 June 1984) is a former Czech biathlete.

Life and career
Moravec represented the Czech Republic at the 2006, 2010, 2014 and 2018. At the 2014 Winter Olympics, he won silver medals in both the pursuit and the mixed relay (together with Jaroslav Soukup, Veronika Vítková and Gabriela Soukalová) and a bronze medal in the mass start. His best World Cup overall finish yet was 6th in the 2014–15 season.

Biathlon results
All results are sourced from the International Biathlon Union.

Olympic Games
3 medals – (2 silver, 1 bronze)

a.  The mixed relay was added as an event in 2014.

World Championships
6 medals – (1 gold, 2 silver, 3 bronze)

a.  During Olympic seasons competitions are only held for those events not included in the Olympic program.
b.  The mixed relay was added as an event in 2005.

Junior/Youth World Championships
 8 medals – (3 silver, 5 bronze)

Individual podiums
 1 victory – (1 MS)
 14 podiums – (4 Sp, 3 Pu, 4 MS, 3 In) 

a.  2014 Winter Olympics races are not included in the 2013–14 World Cup scoring system.

* Results are from UIPMB and IBU races which include the Biathlon World Cup, Biathlon World Championships and the Winter Olympic Games.

Overall record

a.  Includes mixed relay and single mixed relay, the event involves one male and one female biathlete each completing two legs consisting of one prone and one standing shoot.
b.  Until 2007–08 season, top-30 were awarded with World Cup points and biathlete got 50 points for the win. Starting from 2008 to 2009 season another points system is applied in World Cup, top-40 are awarded with World Cup points and winner got 60 points. Results in "Points" row is represented according to the applied scoring system in corresponding season.
c.  Did not finish the race (DNF).

* Statistics as of 19 March 2017.

Shooting

* Results in all IBU World Cup races, Olympics and World Championships including relay events and disqualified races. Statistics as of 19 March 2017.''

References

External links

1984 births
Living people
People from Ústí nad Orlicí
Czech male biathletes
Biathletes at the 2006 Winter Olympics
Biathletes at the 2010 Winter Olympics
Biathletes at the 2014 Winter Olympics
Biathletes at the 2018 Winter Olympics
Olympic biathletes of the Czech Republic
Medalists at the 2014 Winter Olympics
Olympic medalists in biathlon
Olympic bronze medalists for the Czech Republic
Olympic silver medalists for the Czech Republic
Biathlon World Championships medalists
Holmenkollen Ski Festival winners
Sportspeople from the Pardubice Region